Stefan Mädicke (born 22 February 1966) is a German sailor. He competed in the Flying Dutchman event at the 1988 Summer Olympics.

References

External links
 

1966 births
Living people
German male sailors (sport)
Olympic sailors of East Germany
Sailors at the 1988 Summer Olympics – Flying Dutchman
Sportspeople from Halle (Saale)